SG, Sg or sg may refer to:

Arts and entertainment

Music
 "SG" (song), a 2021 song by DJ Snake, Ozuna, Lisa, and Megan Thee Stallion
 Gibson SG, an electric guitar manufactured by Gibson Guitar Corporation
 SG Wannabe, a South Korean music group
 Selena Gomez, an American singer, actress, producer and businesswoman

Other media
 Spy Groove, an American animated television series stylized on screen and in promotional materials as SG
 Stargate, a Canadian-American military science fiction media franchise running from 1994, 1997–2011
 SuicideGirls, a softcore pornographic website
 Steins;Gate (S;G), a science fiction visual novel game developed by 5pb. and Nitroplus
 Sabado Gigante, a Spanish-language weekly variety show with Don Francisco airing from 1962-2015

Businesses and organizations
 sweetgreen, an American restaurant chain, ticker symbol SG.
 SG Automotive, a Chinese vehicle and component manufacturer 
 SG (cigarette), a Portuguese cigarette brand produced by Tabaqueira, an Altria subsidiary
 Sempati Air (IATA airline code SG, from 1968 to 1998)
 Jetsgo (IATA airline code SG, from 2001 to 2005)
 Saint Gabriel's College, a private school in Bangkok, Thailand
 Scots Guards, a British Army Regiment
 Société Générale, a European financial services company
Special Group (India), a confidential special forces unit of India
 SpiceJet (IATA airline code SG, since 2005)
 Straż Graniczna, a Polish border guard formation
 System Group, an Iranian software development company

Places
 Singapore (ISO 3166-1 country code SG)
 Canton of St. Gallen, a canton in Switzerland

Science and technology
.sg, the top-level domain of Singapore
 Samsung Galaxy, series of mobile computing devices
 Seaborgium, symbol Sg, a chemical element
 Sega Genesis, a game console
 SG-43 Goryunov, Stankovyi Goryunova Model 1943, a Soviet medium machine gun
 Specific gravity (symbol SG), another name for Relative density: the weight of a volume of fluid or solution as compared to the weight of the same volume of water
 Standard gamble, a direct method to measure the QALY weight
 Stress granule

Sport
 Shooting guard, a basketball position
 Sanspareils Greenlands, a cricket equipment manufacturer

Other uses
 Sango language (ISO 639-1 code "sg")
 Secretary General
 Shotgun, often in the context of buckshot size
 Star of Gallantry, an Australian gallantry decoration
 St. Gall Priscian Glosses, a set of Old Irish and Latin glosses